A by-election was held for the Australian House of Representatives seat of Parramatta on 10 December 1921. This was triggered by the resignation of Nationalist MP, Treasurer and former Prime Minister Sir Joseph Cook to become Australian High Commissioner to the United Kingdom.

The by-election was won by Nationalist candidate Herbert Pratten, who resigned from the Senate to run.

Results

References

1921 elections in Australia
New South Wales federal by-elections
1920s in New South Wales